Database Nation is a non-fiction book written by Simson Garfinkel.  Published in January 2000, Database Nation provides the reader with a clear understanding of what privacy is today. Starting with a broad definition of privacy, he goes in depth on various new technologies and practices that have reshaped our lives, at the cost of privacy.  Garfinkel goes into great detail to describe each type of privacy intrusion.  The current system prevents the individual from resisting; the individual can only do so much to maintain his privacy.  His most important point is that the right to privacy is a constitutionally protected right and it does not have to be traded away for our way of life.  He calls the government to take a stand for privacy by establishing an agency that will enforce privacy laws and act as a representative of individual privacy.  Overall, he hopes to increase public awareness on the issue of privacy and raise the standard for individual privacy.

References 

This article is based on:
Garfinkel, Simson. Database Nation. United States: O'Reilly 2000. 1-56592-653-6

External links 
 http://www.databasenation.com/home.htm

American non-fiction books
2000 non-fiction books